Arctigenin is a lignan found in certain plants of the Asteraceae, including the greater burdock (Arctium lappa) and Saussurea heteromalla. It has shown antiviral and anticancer effects in vitro. It is the aglycone of arctiin.

The use of arctigenin has been shown to be effective in a mouse model of Japanese encephalitis.

It has been found to act as an agonist of adiponectin receptor 1 (AdipoR1).

References

External links 
 Arctigenin entry in the public domain NCI Dictionary of Cancer Terms

Adiponectin receptor agonists
Lignans
O-methylated natural phenols
Tetrahydrofurans
Lactones